Australia national rugby team may refer to national teams in the different varieties of rugby:

 Australia national rugby union team, often nicknamed the  Wallabies, administered by the Australian Rugby Union.
 Australia national rugby sevens team compete in the World Sevens Series
 Australia national rugby league team, often nicknamed the Kangaroos, administered by Australian Rugby League.

See also
Australia national football team (disambiguation)